State Route 156 (SR 156) is a primary state highway in the U.S. state of Virginia. The state highway runs  from U.S. Route 301 (US 301) and SR 35 in Templeton north to US 360 Business in Mechanicsville. SR 156 follows a circuitous route through the eastern part of the Richmond–Petersburg metropolitan area. South of the James River, the state highway connects Templeton in Prince George County with Hopewell, which is directly served by SR 156 Business. SR 156 crosses the James River on the Benjamin Harrison Memorial Bridge and briefly passes through Charles City County. For most of its length in Henrico and Hanover, the state highway is a rural road that provides access to several units of Richmond National Battlefield Park. However, SR 156 provides access to Richmond International Airport, Interstate 64 (I-64), and I-295 as it passes through the Richmond suburbs of Sandston and Highland Springs as a major highway.

Route description

SR 156 begins at a four-way intersection with US 301 and SR 35 (Courtland Road) in Templeton. The south leg of the intersection is an exit ramp from northbound I-95. US 301 and SR 35 head west along Courtland Road to provide access to the remaining ramps of the highways' diamond interchange with I-95. SR 35 heads east along Courtland Road toward Courtland. SR 156 and US 301 run concurrently north along Prince George Drive before US 301 splits northwest to follow Crater Road toward Petersburg. SR 156 continues northeast along two-lane undivided Prince George Drive toward its junction with US 460 (County Drive) northwest of Disputanta, which occurs just after the state highway crosses Norfolk Southern Railway's Norfolk District. The state highway continues north to the community of Prince George, the county seat of Prince George County, where the highway has a four-way intersection with SR 106 (Courthouse Road) and SR 156 Business (Prince George Drive).  SR 106 heads southwest toward the county office complex, SR 156 Business heads north to serve Hopewell, and SR 156 and SR 106 head northeast along Ruffin Road to bypass Hopewell.

SR 156 and SR 106 follow Ruffin Road to SR 10 (James River Drive); this intersection is also the northern end of SR 156 Business. The two highways turn east to run concurrently with the four-lane divided highway to its next intersection with Jordan Point Road.  SR 156 and SR 106 turn north onto two-lane undivided Jordan Point Road, which leads to Jordan Point. The two highways cross the James River on the Benjamin Harrison Memorial Bridge, a vertical-lift bridge that is named for Benjamin Harrison V, the father of William Henry Harrison and great-grandfather of Benjamin Harrison. The two highways enter Charles City County as Roxbury Road, which they follow north to SR 5 (John Tyler Memorial Highway) at Kimages. SR 5 heads east toward Charles City, SR 106 continues north along Roxbury Road toward Roxbury, and SR 156 turns west to join SR 5 in a concurrency.

SR 156 and SR 5 initially head west but curve north and pass by Shirley Plantation, one of the James River plantations. The two highways pass through the hamlet of Granville, which lies on the James River opposite Turkey Island, which is formed by a bend in the river that encloses Presquile National Wildlife Refuge. Just north of Granville, SR 156 and SR 5 cross Turkey Island Creek into Henrico County, where the highways follow New Market Road until SR 156 turns northeast onto Willis Church Road. At Carters Mill Road, SR 156 makes a right-angle turn north just before passing through the Malvern Hill unit of Richmond National Battlefield Park. The state highway passes Glendale National Cemetery and the Glendale unit of the battlefield park before reaching a four-way intersection with Charles City Road and Darbytown Road, where SR 156 makes a right-angle turn to the east onto Charles City Road. SR 156 follows Charles City Road to Elko Road, onto which the highway turns north to cross the White Oak Swamp and intersect CSX's Peninsula Subdivision in the hamlet of Elko. The state highway passes scattered residential subdivisions as it follows the eastern edge of the Elko Tract, part of which is an industrial park accessed via SR 380 (Elko Tract Road).

North of the Elko Tract, SR 156 turns west and joins US 60 and SR 33 on Williamsburg Road, a four-lane divided highway. The three highways meet I-295 at a cloverleaf interchange and enter the community of Sandston, through which the highways pass as a two-lane undivided road. SR 33 turns north onto Nine Mile Road next to Seven Pines National Cemetery. SR 156 and US 60 expand to a four-lane divided highway again as they begin to follow the northern edge of the Richmond International Airport property. SR 156 and US 60 diverge at Airport Drive, which heads south into the airport and north as part of SR 156. The four-lane divided highway has a cloverleaf interchange with I-64 and, just to the north, intersects Norfolk Southern Railway's Richmond District at grade. SR 156 continues northeast through the community of Highland Springs, where it intersects SR 33 (Nine Mile Road) again. SR 156 has another cloverleaf interchange with I-295. East of the Interstate at Old Hanover Road, the state highway reduces to two lanes and briefly becomes Hanover Road before crossing the Chickahominy River into Hanover County.

SR 156 continues north as Cold Harbor Road, which makes a right-angle turn west at SR 619 (Rockhill Road) to pass by the Gaines' Mill and Cold Harbor units of Richmond National Battlefield Park. After intersecting SR 615 (Creighton Road), which provides access to I-295, the state highway enters a suburban area where the highway makes another right-angle turn west at SR 636 (Walnut Grove Road) and SR 643 (Lee Davis Road). SR 156 crosses over I-295 with no access and passes by the Beaver Dam Creek unit of the battlefield park before entering Mechanicsville. The state highway has a three-quarter diamond interchange with US 360 (Mechanicsville Bypass) just before reaching its northern terminus at US 360 Business (Mechanicsville Turnpike), which completes the missing westbound US 360 to SR 156 movement of the interchange. The road continues northwest as SR 638 (Atlee Road).

Major intersections

Bannered route

Hopewell business route

Virginia State Route 156 Business (SR 156 Business) is a business route of SR 156 through the independent city of Hopewell. The highway runs  from SR 156 and SR 106 in Prince George north to SR 156, SR 10, and SR 106 near Jordan Point. SR 156 Business begins as Prince George Drive, which heads northwest as a two-lane undivided road from the SR 156–SR 106 junction and enters the city of Hopewell by crossing Bailey Creek. The highway enters the city as Arlington Road, which immediately expands to four lanes. When Arlington Road splits to the north, SR 156 Business continues on High Street to SR 36 (Winston Churchill Drive). The business route turns northeast onto the four-lane divided highway and runs concurrently with SR 36 until that highway turns onto Arlington Road to head toward downtown Hopewell. SR 156 Business intersects several rail spurs as the highway enters an industrial area. Within the industrial area, the business route intersects SR 10 (Randolph Road). SR 156 Business and SR 10 run concurrently east out of the industrial area. The highways leave the city of Hopewell by crossing Bailey Creek again before the business route reaches its northern terminus at the intersection between SR 156, SR 10, and SR 106.

References

External links

Virginia Highways Project: VA 156

156
State Route 156
State Route 156
State Route 156
State Route 156
State Route 156